Nikola Vasić (Serbian Cyrillic: Никола Васић, born September 15, 1984) is a Serbian retired professional basketball player.

Career
Being a product of FMP's youth system, Nikola has passed through all of the club's ranks, as a top player. After playing in the youth and the second team, he was loaned to Borac Čačak, then an FMP's affiliate.

Following a season of playing at FMP as a starting shooting guard, Nikola moved to Spain, signing a four-year contract with an ACB League side Alicante. After only a year there, he moved to an ambitious Triumph Lyubertsy side, which he left after six months to play only 16 games during a season and a half at Spanish Fuenlabrada.

He spent the following season at then the Ukrainian EuroChallenge representative, Polytekhnika-Halychyna, but appeared in only six matches, due to chronic injury problems in his back. He missed most of the 2009-10 and the whole 2010-11 season recovering from an injury.

In August 2013, he signed with UBC Gussing Knights. He left them before the start of the season and then in  November 2013, he signed with Elektra Šoštanj. He parted ways with Elektra in January 2014.

References

External links 
 Nikola Vasić at fiba.com
 Nikola Vasić at eurobasket.com

1984 births
Living people
ABA League players
Baloncesto Fuenlabrada players
BC Kyiv players
BC Politekhnika-Halychyna players
BC Zenit Saint Petersburg players
CB Lucentum Alicante players
Guards (basketball)
KK Borac Čačak players
KK Crvena zvezda players
KK FMP (1991–2011) players
KK Zlatibor players
Liga ACB players
Serbian expatriate basketball people in Russia
Serbian expatriate basketball people in Slovenia
Serbian expatriate basketball people in Spain
Serbian expatriate basketball people in Ukraine
Serbian men's basketball players
Sportspeople from Šabac
Universiade medalists in basketball
Universiade gold medalists for Serbia and Montenegro
Medalists at the 2003 Summer Universiade